Tahni Nestor (born 3 March 1991) is an Australian rules footballer who played for Carlton and North Melbourne in the AFL Women's (AFLW) competition.

AFLW career
Nestor recruited by Carlton as an injury replacement player midway through the 2017 season. She made her debut in the fourth round of the season against Melbourne at Casey Fields. She was delisted at season's end after having played three matches at AFLW level. In 2019, Nestor was drafted by North Melbourne. After playing nine games in two seasons at the club, she was delisted in June 2021.

References

External links

Living people
1991 births
Carlton Football Club (AFLW) players
Australian rules footballers from Victoria (Australia)
Sportswomen from Victoria (Australia)
Melbourne University Football Club (VFLW) players
North Melbourne Football Club (AFLW) players